Mateus da Silva Duarte  (born 7 October 1998), commonly known as Mateusinho, is a Brazilian professional footballer who plays as a right back for Cuiabá.

Club career
Born in Magé, Rio de Janeiro, Mateusinho made his senior debut with CF Rio de Janeiro in the 2016 Campeonato Carioca Série C. After playing just one match for Serrano-RJ in the 2017 Campeonato Carioca Série B1, he moved to America-RJ ahead of the 2018 season, but played for the under-20 side.

Mateusinho later played for Carioca Série C side  in the remainder of the 2018 season, and remained more than a year without a club before being presented at Goytacaz in August 2020. On 8 February 2021, he joined Moto Club.

In August 2021, Mateuzinho was announced in the squad of Tuntum for the year's Campeonato Maranhense Segunda Divisão. The following 5 January, he agreed to a deal with Série B side Sampaio Corrêa.

On 18 January 2023, after being a regular starter for Sampaio during the 2022 season, Mateusinho signed a five-year contract with Série A team Cuiabá; the club paid R$ 1.3 million for 50% of his economic rights.

Career statistics

Honours
Mageense
Campeonato Carioca Série C: 2018

Tuntum
Copa Federação Maranhense de Futebol: 2021

Sampaio Corrêa
Campeonato Maranhense: 2022

References

1998 births
Living people
Sportspeople from Rio de Janeiro (state)
Brazilian footballers
Association football defenders
Campeonato Brasileiro Série B players
Serrano Football Club players
Goytacaz Futebol Clube players
Moto Club de São Luís players
Sampaio Corrêa Futebol Clube players
Cuiabá Esporte Clube players
People from Magé